The women's omnium competition at the 2020 UEC European Track Championships will be held on 13 November 2020.

Results

Scratch race

Tempo race

Elimination race

Points race and final standings
The final ranking is given by the sum of the points obtained in the 4 specialties.

References

Women's omnium
European Track Championships – Women's omnium